The Arab Deterrent Force (ADF) was an international peacekeeping force created by the Arab League in the extraordinary Riyadh Summit on 17–18 October 1976, attended only by heads of state from Egypt, Kuwait, Lebanon, Saudi Arabia, and Syria. It decided to transform the 'token' Arab Security Force into the Arab Deterrent Force. A week later, the conclusions of the Riyadh Summit were endorsed and implemented by the Arab League's Cairo summit on 25–26 October 1976.

As the Lebanese Civil War escalated in 1976, the Arab League created an intervention force composed almost entirely of Syrian forces with token contributions from other Arab states, including Sudan, Saudi Arabia and Libya.  Although nominally present at the behest of the government of Lebanon, the force was under the direct command of Syria. The ADF initially consisted of 30,000 troops of which 25,000 were provided by Syria. In late 1978, after the Arab League had extended the mandate of the Arab Deterrent Force, the Sudanese, the Saudis and the United Arab Emirates announced intentions to withdraw troops from Lebanon, extending their stay into the early months of 1979 at the Lebanese governments request. The Libyan troops were essentially abandoned and had to find their own way home (if at all), and the ADF thereby became a purely Syrian force (which did include the Palestinian Liberation Army (PLA)).

The ADF mandate was to deter the conflicting sides from resorting to conflict again, including the tasks of maintaining cease-fire, collecting heavy weapons and supporting the Lebanese government in  maintaining its authority.

Robert Fisk wrote:
[...] Since the summer of 1976, the Syrians had controlled the Bekaa Valley. The headquarters of their 'Arab Deterrent Force' was at the Bekaa market town of Chtaura and their troops were billetted all the way up the valley, around the Greek Orthodox town of Zahle - where Cody and I had seen the Syrians and Phalangists cooperating in 1976 - at the airbase at Rayak, in Baalbek, and Hermel.

In 1981, the Syrian forces fought the Battle of Zahleh. R.D. Mclaurin wrote '..At the height of the battle, several Syrian Army units, totalling about 20,000 troops, were within an area 10–20 km around Zahleh.' These units included the 35th and 41st Brigades (Special Forces), 47th and 62nd Brigade (Mechanised Infantry), 51st Brigade (Ind. Armoured), and 67th Brigade, of which the last was along the border with Syria, southwest of Medina Sinaia.

A year after Israel invaded and occupied Southern Lebanon during the 1982 Lebanon War, the Lebanese government failed to extend the ADF's mandate, thereby effectively ending its existence, although not the Syrian or Israeli military presence in Lebanon. Eventually the Syrian presence became known as the Syrian occupation of Lebanon.

Operations and Peacekeeping

At 4:30 AM Monday November 15 1976 The Arab Deterrent Forces consisting of 5,000 Sudanese, Saudi and Emirati Soldiers and 25,000 Syrian Soldiers deployed in and around Beirut in an attempt to cease hostilities between the Kataeb/Phalangist Lebanese government and the Palestine Liberation Organization. The Syrian peacekeepers began distributing weapons and support to pro-Syrian factions within both parties in Beirut at the time which lead to accusations that Syria was acting more as an occupying force and less as a peace-keeping force. On July 21 1977, The Lebanese and Palestinian factions agreed on a compromise that would see the withdrawal of all PLO soldiers inside a 15 kilometer zone just off the Israeli Border and the Lebanese government would work in conjunction with the Arab Deterrent Force to ensure security of Lebanon. on July 30 1977, Syrian soldiers were deployed in The Beqaa Valley and near Tripoli. June 1983 would seem the fracturing of the compromise between the Lebanese Government, the Arab Deterrent Forces and the Syrian Peacekeepers especially after the 1982 Israeli Invasion of Lebanon.

Notes

References
 Claudio Lo Jacono, "L’intervento della Siria in Libano", in: Oriente Moderno, LVI, 1976, pp. 379–399. ["The intervention of Syria in Lebanon", in: Modern East.] 1976م: قوات الردع العربية تدخل بيروت في محاولة لإيقاف الحرب الأهلية " Arab Deterrent Forces enter Beirut in an attempt to stop the civil war"

Further reading
J-P Issele, 'The Arab Deterrent Force in Lebanon, 1976-1983,' in A. Cassese, 'The Current Legal Regulation of the Use of Force,' Leiden: Nijhoff, 1986, 179 at 186-7.
Istvan Pogany, The Arab League and Peacekeeping in the Lebanon, Palgrave Macmillan (December 1987), .

Arab League
Lebanese Civil War
Multinational units and formations
Military units and formations of Syria
Military units and formations established in 1976
Middle East peace efforts
Lebanon–Syria relations